The following is a list of indoor arenas in New Zealand. Most of the arenas in this list have multiple uses such as individual sports, team sports as well as cultural events and political events. The arenas in the table are ranked by capacity; the arenas with the highest capacities are listed first.

Current arenas

See also
List of indoor arenas
List of stadiums in New Zealand

References

 
New Zealand
Indoor arenas
Indoor